"Chained to You" is a song by Australian pop group Savage Garden, released as the fifth single from their second studio album Affirmation.

Background
"Chained to You" was released as a single, exclusively in Australia and remote areas of Europe on 2 October 2000. The single's cover art was also used for the album's seventh and final single, "The Best Thing", which was released in the United Kingdom and Europe. The song peaked at number 16 on the ARIA Singles Chart. No official music video was made. The group's performance from the Superstars and Cannonballs DVD was made into a music video, which eventually aired on MTV.

In a video posted on the band's Facebook page on 20 June 2015, singer Darren Hayes explained the story behind the song: his first experience of a gay kiss, "in New York City, at a Brooklyn nightclub called Splash." He also referenced Madonna's song "Ray of Light" as an inspiration and described "Chained to You" as "a 1980s throwback".

This song was one of Savage Garden's few singles that did not make the cut for their greatest hits compilation Truly Madly Completely: The Best of Savage Garden. The live tracks on the CD single were recorded at the Brisbane Entertainment Centre, May 2000. "I Knew I Loved You" differs from the version that appears on the "Affirmation" CD single, in that there is an additional remix section at the end.

Track listings
Australia
 "Chained to You" – 4:08
 "Affirmation" (live in Brisbane, May 2000) – 5:44
 "I Want You" (live in Brisbane, May 2000) – 3:55
 "I Knew I Loved You" (live in Brisbane, May 2000) – 8:23

Europe
 "Chained to You" – 4:08
 "Affirmation" (live in Brisbane, May 2000) – 5:44

References

1999 songs
2000 singles
Columbia Records singles
Savage Garden songs
Songs written by Daniel Jones (musician)
Songs written by Darren Hayes
Songs written by Walter Afanasieff